The Beilu Yiyu also known as Yiyu is a Ming-era Mongol-Chinese dictionary.

References

Further reading
 Ákos Bertalan Apatóczky: Yiyu 譯語 (Beilu yiyu 北虜譯語). An indexed critical edition of a 16th century Sino-Mongolian glossary. Global Oriental Publishers, Brill, 2009.

Chinese dictionaries
History of the Mongolian language
Translation dictionaries
Mongolian dictionaries